Ashley Day (born 17 September 1999) is an Australian cricketer who plays as a right-handed batter and right-arm leg break bowler for Western Australia in the Women's National Cricket League (WNCL). She previously played for Tasmania and Hobart Hurricanes.

References

External links

Ashley Day at Cricket Australia

1999 births
Living people
Cricketers from New South Wales
Australian women cricketers
Hobart Hurricanes (WBBL) cricketers
Tasmanian Tigers (women's cricket) cricketers
Western Australia women cricketers